Dextra Manufacturing (DM) is part of the Dextra Group of companies.  DM develops, manufactures, and markets engineered products for use in concrete construction projects worldwide, such as bridges, power stations, buildings, tunnels, and other infrastructure.  DM's core competency includes mechanical splices (couplers) and anchorages (headed bars) for reinforcing steel, as well as high tensile bars, GRFP products, and various concrete construction accessories.

Mechanical Splices & Anchorages 
Dextra manufactures various brands of mechanical splices and anchorages, designed in accordance with the differing levels of performance criteria found throughout the world.  The most common features of Dextra's Rolltec, Bartec, and Griptec splices are that they are all "parallel-threaded" systems.

Some of the common features of Dextra's parallel threaded splicing systems are as follows:
 No specific torque is required to assemble the splicing system
 Inspection of the assembled system is visual
 Cross-threading of threads not possible
 Greater structural performance

Manufacturing companies based in Bangkok
Companies with year of establishment missing
Construction and civil engineering companies of Thailand